Sunbird Aviation was an airline in Kenya which merged with Air Kenya in 1987 to form Airkenya Aviation. The airline was owned by the Cole Family.

Accidents and incidents
One of Sunbird's aircraft, a Beechcraft Super King Air 200, registration number N 821CA was intended to transport the exile government of James Mancham as well as Kenyan military support from Mombasa following the failed 1981 Seychelles coup d'état attempt.

On 15 August 1987, Douglas DC-3 5Y-DAK crashed on approach to Kilaguni Airport. All 28 people on board survived.

References

External links
http://aviation-safety.net/database/operator/airline.php?var=5237

Defunct airlines of Kenya
Airlines disestablished in 1987